The 2021 Food City 300 was the 26th stock car race of the 2021 NASCAR Xfinity Series season, the final race of the NASCAR Xfinity Series regular season, and the 40th iteration of the event. The race was held on Friday, September 17, 2021 in Bristol, Tennessee at Bristol Motor Speedway, a  permanent oval-shaped racetrack. The race was extended from the scheduled 300 laps to 306 due to a late race caution, setting up a NASCAR overtime finish. In a wild finish, Austin Cindric and A. J. Allmendinger wrecked across the line after a wild restart saw numerous passes for position in the lead positions. The person who crossed the line first was A. J. Allmendinger, cementing a win for Allmendinger, his 9th win of his career and the 4th of the season. To fill out the podium, Riley Herbst of Stewart-Haas Racing would finish 3rd.

Background 

The Bristol Motor Speedway, formerly known as Bristol International Raceway and Bristol Raceway, is a NASCAR short track venue located in Bristol, Tennessee. Constructed in 1960, it held its first NASCAR race on July 30, 1961. Despite its short length, Bristol is among the most popular tracks on the NASCAR schedule because of its distinct features, which include extraordinarily steep banking, an all concrete surface, two pit roads, and stadium-like seating. It has also been named one of the loudest NASCAR tracks.

Entry list

Starting lineup 
Qualifying was determined by a qualifying metric system based on the last race, the 2021 Go Bowling 250 and owner's points. As a result, Noah Gragson of JR Motorsports won the pole.

Race results 
Stage 1 Laps: 85

Stage 2 Laps: 85

Stage 3 Laps: 136

References 

2021 NASCAR Xfinity Series
NASCAR races at Bristol Motor Speedway
Food City 300
Food City 300